José Mamede Aleixo Ferreira (born 24 February 1974), known as Mamede, is a Portuguese retired footballer who played as a midfielder.

During his professional career he played mainly in Italy (nine years), but almost never in Serie A – only 50 games over the course of four seasons.

Club career
Born in Torrão, Alcácer do Sal, Mamede started playing professionally with Vitória Futebol Clube, remaining with the Setúbal side for seven seasons – one loan notwithstanding – five spent in the Primeira Liga. In 2000–01 he moved abroad, joining Serie A's Reggina Calcio and scoring once in a campaign which ended in relegation, although he stayed with the club and helped it return to the top division the immediate year after.

In 2003–04, Mamede joined FC Messina Peloro and proved decisive in the team's promotion to the top flight. However, he was scarcely used the following two campaigns (only one game in the former), and dropped down to the third tier in January 2006, signing with Genoa CFC.

Subsequently, Mamede stayed in Italy for the duration of his career, playing with Perugia Calcio, Salernitana Calcio 1919 and Potenza SC, all on loan from Genoa.

References

External links

1974 births
Living people
Portuguese footballers
Association football midfielders
Primeira Liga players
Liga Portugal 2 players
Segunda Divisão players
Vitória F.C. players
Juventude Sport Clube players
Serie A players
Serie B players
Serie C players
Reggina 1914 players
A.C.R. Messina players
Genoa C.F.C. players
A.C. Perugia Calcio players
U.S. Salernitana 1919 players
Potenza S.C. players
Portuguese expatriate footballers
Expatriate footballers in Italy
Portuguese expatriate sportspeople in Italy
Sportspeople from Setúbal District